Winslow Corbett is an American actress.

Career
Corbett toured as Elaine Robinson in the stage version of The Graduate during the 2000s, as well as touring in several other plays, and appeared in the television film A Change of Heart (1998).

Filmography

Television

References

External links
 
 A humorous interview with Corbett from the Portland Mercury

Living people
American stage actresses
Winslow
20th-century American actresses
Year of birth missing (living people)